Jandiala Guru, commonly known as Jandiala, is a town in the Amritsar district of Punjab, India. It is located on the Grand Trunk Road, and has an altitude of 229 m (754 ft).

History
Jandiala Guru is named after Jand, the son of the founder. The municipality was created in 1867 during the colonial period of British rule and formed part of Amritsar Tehsil. The town was situated on the route of the North-Western Railway. The population according to the 1901 census was 7,750, and the revenue of the town in 1903-4 was Rs. 8,400, mainly from octroi taxes.

Previously, it was surrounded by a mud wall and had seven gates. Some of these gates, at least their ramparts are still intact.

At the turn of the 21st century the population was estimated at about 100,000. Large communities are Ghangas (Jatts),  Majhbi Sikh  SC , Jains (mainly jewelers, grain Merchants, and businessmen), Malhotras (Khatri), Kamboj & Thatheras (utensil makers),  and Christians. Large concentration of these skillful artisans make Jandiala Guru the hub for jewelry and utensils for the surrounding areas.

Previously, it was surrounded by a mud wall and had seven gates. Some of these gates or their outside remains can still be seen.

The town has religious diversity. A number of popular and well visited religious places for Sikhs, Hindus, Jains and Muslims exist in and around the town. 
A historical Gurudwara of Baba Hundal (Baba Hundal Tap Asthan) is well known and well visited religious place.

A crafts colony of Thatheras was established during the reign of Maharaja Ranjit Singh (1883) the great 19th Century Sikh Monarch, who encouraged skilled metal crafters from Kashmir to settle here.

In 2014, the traditional brass and copper craft of utensil making among the Thatheras of Jandiala Guru got enlisted on the List of Intangible Cultural Heritage by UNESCO. After the listing, the Deputy Commissioner of Amritsar launched Project Virasat to revive this craft.

Politics
The city is part of the Jandiala Assembly Constituency.

References

Cities and towns in Amritsar district